Henryk Kowalczyk (born 15 July 1956) is a Polish politician and teacher, who is serving as Deputy Prime Minister of Poland and Minister of Agriculture and Rural Development since 2021. 

He was first elected to the Sejm on 25 September 2005. In 2006–2007, secretary of state in the Ministry of Agriculture and Rural Development. From 2015 to 2018 he was a minister without portfolio in the cabinet of Beata Szydło. At the same time he was the chair of the Standing Committee of the Council of Ministers and vice-chair of the Economic Committee of the Council of Ministers. In 2016 he was the acting Minister of State Treasury. In the years 2018–2019 the [[Ministry of Environment (Poland)
|minister of the environment]] in the first government of Mateusz Morawiecki. In 2021, he was designated as the Deputy Prime Minister of Poland and  Minister of Agriculture and Rural Development.

See also
Members of Polish Sejm 2005–2007

Footnotes

External links

Henryk Kowalczyk – parliamentary page – includes declarations of interest, voting record, and transcripts of speeches.

University of Warsaw alumni
Law and Justice politicians
1956 births
Living people
Members of the Polish Sejm 2005–2007
Members of the Polish Sejm 2007–2011
Members of the Polish Sejm 2011–2015
Members of the Polish Sejm 2015–2019
Members of the Polish Sejm 2019–2023
Politicians from Gdańsk
Environment ministers
Government ministers of Poland